Saya e Khuda e Zuljalal (a.k.a. SKZ, meaning Protection of Magnificent God) is  2016 Pakistani action war film/historical film which explores Pakistan's history, beginning from its Independence in 1947 up to the present day. The film is directed by Umair Fazli & produced by Jehan Films and AR Productions. The film is facilitated by Brig. Syed Mujtaba Tirmizi from ISPR and is written by Tauseef Razaque and Inam Qureshi. The cast includes Javed Sheikh, Firdous Jamal, Moammar Rana, Rachel Gill, Sohail Sameer, Arbaaz Khan, Kamran Mujahid, Asad Malik, Rambo, Nayyar Ejaz, Shafqat Cheema, Noor Bukhari, Umar Cheema and Nimra Khan in lead roles. An earlier working title for the film was Mission Allah-u-Akbar. The film has been supported by the Inter-Services Public Relations (ISPR) and Pakistan Air Force.

Synopsis
It is a story of Pakistani heroes of the nation during the war of 1965, what Pakistan was supposed to be and what it is today. It also takes the audience through a period of history that has been forgotten.

Cast

Production

Filming
The producer in an Interview with Express Tribune stated that ISPR, had allocated the production budget for the Samjhota Express Scene but they were also kind enough to allow the film crew access to certain locations for Film Shooting. Including a location a kilometer away from the Indian Border for the scene where Shaheed Major Aziz Bhatti's was martyred. The film's Post-production has been done locally in the city of Lahore. The film currently is believed to be the most expensive film made at the moment therefore it took the film crew almost 4 years to produce an official trailer for the film.

Special effects
The film has extensively used CGI in order to give the film high visual effects value.

Music
A unity Song for the film is sung by former Cricket fast bowler Shoaib Akhtar and two of the film's main cast Kamran Mujahid and Rambo, as well as musicians Irfan Saleem and Asjad.

Soundtrack

The complete album was released in November 2016 at Urdu Pin Point.

Track listing

Release
The film was initially due for a late November 2015 release but it had got pushed back almost a year for a Fall 2016 release. After few teaser-trailers (Teaser, Trailer 1, and Trailer 2) the official trailer for the film was released online on 12 August 2016. The film will be released in Fall 2016. Despite the film having an initial release of November 2016, but being delayed again due to production constraints, the film will be released in Pakistan on 16 December 2016. Saya e Khuda e Zuljalal will be released across in 49 Pakistani Cinemas.

List of Cinemas

See also
List of Pakistani films of 2016

References

External links 
 
 Saya e Khuda e Zuljalal on Facebook
 SKZ's trailer on Vimeo

Pakistani action films
2016 films
2016 action films
2010s Urdu-language films